The National Festival of Youth Music, is a music festival in Iran that highlights Iranian music performed by young musicians.

The festival took place for the first time in December 1999. Since then, it has been taking place seasonally at several halls in Tehran, including the Roudaki Hall, organized by the Iran Music Association, the House of Music, the Music Office of the Ministry of Ershad, and the Rudaki Foundation.

See also
Musicema Awards
Fajr International Music Festival

References

Music festivals in Iran
Annual events in Iran
1999 establishments in Iran